Pál Urbán (born 14 January 1989 in Kecskemét) is a Hungarian football player who currently plays for Dunaújváros Pálhalma SE.

References
Player profile at HLSZ 

1989 births
Living people
People from Kecskemét
Hungarian footballers
Association football defenders
Kecskeméti TE players
Sportspeople from Bács-Kiskun County